Island Technology Professionals is Prince Edward Island's independent certifying body for engineering/applied science technicians and technologists.  It is an official trade name of the Association of Certified Engineering Technicians and Technologists of Prince Edward Island.

Island Technology Professionals confers the designations "C.Tech.", "C.E.T." and "A.Sc.T." which are symbols of achievement in engineering/applied science technology and are legally protected for use only by fully certified members.  The designations are recognized across Canada by many employers and other engineering professionals through the efforts of provincial associations that make up the Canadian Council of Technicians and Technologists (CCTT).  Through CCTT being a signatory, Island Technology Professionals recognizes international transferability through the Sydney Accord, the Dublin Accord and the Engineering Technologist Mobility Forum, which confers the ability to award the designation IntET(Canada) for Technologists who wish to work internationally.

Island Technology Professionals, under the name Prince Edward Island Society of Engineering Technicians and Technologists, was established in 1972.

In 2007  Island Technology Professionals (under the current name of ACETTPEI), with the assistance of other Atlantic Canada Technology organizations and some federal government funds, held the Atlantic Canada Technology Roundtable.  This was a meeting of private, public, and educational sectors to examine the issues of technology skills shortages which may have hampered economic growth in the region and is expected to get worse due to baby boomer retirement.

See also
Engineering technologist
Engineering technician
Applied Science Technologist
Professional Technologist
IntET(Canada)

External links
Island Technology Professionals

Organizations based in Charlottetown
Professional associations based in Canada
Professional titles and certifications
Professional certification in engineering